Osaterone (developmental code name TZP-5258), also known as 17α-hydroxy-6-chloro-2-oxa-6-dehydroprogesterone, as well as 2-oxachloromadinone, is a steroidal antiandrogen and progestin that was never marketed. The C17α acetate ester of osaterone, osaterone acetate, in contrast, has been marketed.

See also
 Chlormadinone
 Delmadinone
 Oxendolone

References

Organochlorides
Pregnanes
Progestogens
Steroidal antiandrogens
Delta-lactones